Blood Duster was an Australian extreme metal and stoner rock band from Melbourne. Their name came from the song "Blood Duster" by John Zorn, from the 1989 album Naked City.

History

Formation
The band was formed in 1991 by Jason Fuller (aka Jason PC) (bass), Anonymous (vocals and guitar), and Andrew Brown (drums). After completion of their first demo, Anonymous resigned and was replaced by Troy Darlington and Callum Wilson.

A self-released demo recording in 1992 was titled Menstrual Soup. By the time the band recorded their first EP, Wilson and Darlington had been replaced by Tony Forde, Shane Rout, and Brad Johnston.

Fisting the Dead (1993)

Fisting the Dead, the band's debut, is a straightforward grindcore EP that featured 25 tracks, released in mid-1993. According to Rosemary Overell, "They are largely credited with establishing Melbourne's gore- and porno-grindcore aesthetic". The tracks were initially recorded for a proposed split album on the Wild Rags label with other tracks by Impetigo and Meat Shits. The track "Derek" refers to a character played by Peter Jackson in his 1987 cult film Bad Taste, which was "heavily influenced by the late-'80s grindcore of such Earache label bands as Carcass and Napalm Death."

In 1996, the album was released in the US as bonus tracks on the U.S. CD issue of the group's 1995 EP Yeest, on Relapse Records and Drug Bust Records. In 2001, it was reissued on vinyl with Yeest on the B-side.

In 2005, the album was reissued  as Fisting the Dead... Again on bassist Jason Fuller's label, with bonus tracks, on Goat Sounds Records.

In 2008, it was reissued on Stomp Records with Yeest, the compilation tracks, and live tracks from a gig at the Great Britain Hotel on 18 August 1993 as bonus tracks. AllMusic's Tom Forget described the 2008 version: "A noticeable splatter seems to accompany every spin of Blood Duster's mammoth reissue". He felt that it "traces the band's early-90s grind heyday, before elements of Southern and stoner rock groove seeped into their toxic sound."

1995–2000
In 1995, Blood Duster released the EP Yeest, which started to show some more rock leanings. The band toured Australia including Canberra in November 1995.

The band next produced 1998's Str8 Outta Northcote, which featured a bizarre combination of Southern rock riffs and blasting grindcore.

In 1998, Blood Duster again toured Australia with Brutal Truth, and recorded shows for a planned double live album. The next album, controversially entitled Cunt, was released worldwide in 2001 and saw Blood Duster returning to a more percussive-driven grind style. It was also around this time that the band appeared in the music video for the song "Thunderbirds Are Coming Out" by fellow Australian band TISM.

2001–2017
After touring with The Dwarves in 2001, Blood Duster released the Drink, Fight, Fuck EP, which featured the track "66.6FMONYOURRADIODIAL", used in a television commercial for Reflex copying paper, along with three songs in the pre-gap.

The eponymous Blood Duster album was released in 2003 and featured special guests including original AC/DC singer Dave Evans, Jay Dunne from 28 Days, and all three members of Melbourne band The Spazzys. Two further singles were released from this album, "IWannaDoItWithADonna" in 2003 and "SixSixSixteen" in 2004.

Most of 2004 was spent touring Australia, first with the Big Day Out festival and then their own shows. Following tours with The Dwarves and Pungent Stench in early 2005, Blood Duster toured across Europe and Japan to promote the release of their first DVD, The Shape of Death to Come. In 2006, the band issued the live album Kill, Kill, Kill in a limited edition of 500 copies. The album was recorded in Sydney in 1996 during a tour with Brutal Truth.

In 2006, Blood Duster began pre-production for a proposed triple album consisting of a disc each of death metal, grind, and drone doom, with guest 1970s balladeer and actor Darryl Cotton. Lyden Nå (Norwegian for The Now Sound) was released in April 2007 as a double album, with the third disc available as additional downloadable content.

In October 2012, the group released KVLT, a vinyl album, which had been deliberately rendered unplayable; its producer Jason PC explained "It's kind of a statement piece ... We made the album, sat down and listened to it, thought: 'Yep, that's perfect, let's wreck it'."

Blood Duster played their final show on 9 December 2017 at the Corner Hotel, Richmond.

Members

Final members
Jason Fuller - bass, vocals (1991-2017)
Tony Forde - vocals (1993-2017)
Matt Rizzo - drums (1994-1995, 1999-2007, 2014-2017)
Matt Collins - guitar (2000-2017)

Former members
Brick - drums (1991)
Callum Wilson - vocals (1992)
Troy Darlington - guitar (1992)
Shane Rout - drums (1993-1994, 1999)
Brad Johnson - guitar (1994)
Euan Heriot - drums (1995-1999)
Fin Allman - guitar (1995-2000)
Josh Nixon - guitar (2000-2003)
Scott Pritchard - guitar, vocals (2002-2015)
David Haley - drums (2007-2014)

Timeline

Discography

Albums

EPs and singles

References

External links
 Official Blood Duster Web Site
 BEAT 2007 Interview
 Blood Duster Official Facebook page

Musical groups established in 1991
Victoria (Australia) musical groups
Australian heavy metal musical groups
Deathgrind musical groups
Grindcore musical groups
Relapse Records artists
Australian stoner rock musical groups
Musical quintets
1991 establishments in Australia